Xu Guiyuan (born January 29, 1996) is a Chinese baseball first baseman and outfielder for the Kōchi Fighting Dogs of the Shikoku Island League Plus.

Career
Xu signed with the Baltimore Orioles as a free agent in July 2015 from the MLB Development Center in Wuxi, Jiangsu, China, making him the first player from one of MLB's three development centers in China to sign with a major league team.

In 2016, Xu made his professional debut with the GCL Orioles where he slashed .247/.271/.284 in 33 games and returned there in 2017, batting .179 with seven RBIs in 15 games.

In 2018, Xu was promoted to the low-A Aberdeen IronBirds. After the 2018 season, he signed with the Auckland Tuatara of the Australian Baseball League for the 2018/19 season.

On March 25, 2019, Xu was released by the Orioles organization. On May 27, 2019, Xu signed with the Kōchi Fighting Dogs of the Shikoku Island League Plus.

International
Xu played in the 2017 World Baseball Classic with China.

References

External links

1996 births
Living people
Aberdeen IronBirds players
Auckland Tuatara players
Expatriate baseball players in New Zealand
Baseball first basemen
Baseball outfielders
Chinese expatriate baseball players in Japan
Chinese expatriate baseball players in the United States
Gulf Coast Orioles players
People from Jieyang
2017 World Baseball Classic players
Chinese expatriate sportspeople in New Zealand